PDE surfaces are used in geometric modelling and computer graphics for creating smooth surfaces conforming to a given boundary configuration. PDE surfaces use partial differential equations to generate a surface which usually satisfy a mathematical boundary value problem.

PDE surfaces were first introduced into the area of geometric modelling and computer graphics by two British mathematicians, Malcolm Bloor and Michael Wilson.

Technical details
The PDE method involves generating a surface for some boundary by means of solving an elliptic partial differential equation of the form

The boundary conditions on the function  and its 
normal derivatives  
are imposed at the edges of the surface patch.

With the above formulation it is notable that the elliptic partial differential operator in the above PDE represents a smoothing process in which the value of the function at any point on the surface is, in some sense, a weighted average of the surrounding 
values. In this way, a surface is obtained as a smooth transition between 
the chosen set of boundary conditions.

When , the PDE is the biharmonic equation: . The biharmonic equation is the equation produced by applying the Euler-Lagrange equation to the simplified thin plate energy functional .

Applications
PDE surfaces can be used in many application areas. These include computer-aided design, interactive design, parametric design, computer animation, computer-aided physical analysis and design optimisation.

References
M.I.G. Bloor and M.J. Wilson, Generating Blend Surfaces using Partial Differential Equations, Computer Aided Design, 21(3), 165-171, (1989).
H. Ugail, M.I.G. Bloor, and M.J. Wilson, Techniques for Interactive Design Using the PDE Method, ACM Transactions on Graphics, 18(2), 195-212, (1999).  
J. Huband, W. Li and R. Smith, An Explicit Representation of Bloor-Wilson PDE Surface Model by using Canonical Basis for Hermite Interpolation, Mathematical Engineering in Industry, 7(4), 421-33 (1999). 
H. Du and H. Qin, Direct Manipulation and Interactive Sculpting of PDE surfaces, Computer Graphics Forum, 19(3), C261-C270, (2000).
H. Ugail, Spine Based Shape Parameterisations for PDE surfaces, Computing, 72, 195--204, (2004).
L. You, P. Comninos, J.J. Zhang, PDE Blending Surfaces with C2 Continuity, Computers and Graphics, 28(6), 895-906, (2004).

External links
 Simulation based design, DVE research (University of Bradford, UK). (A java applet demonstrating the properties of PDE surfaces) 
 Dept Applied Mathematics, University of Leeds details on Bloor and Wilsons work.

Surfaces
Computer graphics
Elliptic partial differential equations
Computer-aided design
Multivariate interpolation